Euryalus refers to the Euryalus fortress, the main citadel of Ancient Syracuse, and to several different characters from Greek mythology and classical literature:

Classical mythology
Euryalus, named on sixth and fifth century BC pottery as being one of the Giants who fought the Olympian gods in the Gigantomachy.
Euryalus, a suitor of Hippodamia who, like all the suitors before Pelops, was killed by Oenomaus.
Euryalus, one of the eight sons of Melas, who plotted against their uncle Oeneus and were slain by Tydeus.
 Euryalus, the Argive son of Mecisteus and Astyoche and one of the Argonauts. He attacked the city of Thebes as one of the Epigoni, who took the city and avenged the deaths of their fathers, who had also attempted to invade Thebes. In Homer's Iliad, he fought in the Trojan War, where he was brother-in-arms of Diomedes, and one of the Greeks to enter the Trojan Horse. He lost the boxing match to Epeius at the funeral games for Patroclus. He is mentioned by Hyginus, who gives his parents as Pallas and Diomede.
Euryalus (or Agrolas), brother and fellow builder of Hyperbius the Athenian.
Euryalus was the name of a son of Euippe and Odysseus, who was mistakenly slain by his father for plotting against his father.
Euryalus, son of Naubolus, one of the Phaeacians encountered by Odysseus in the Odyssey.
Euryalus, one of the Suitors of Penelope who came from Dulichium along with other 56 wooers. Euryalus, with the other suitors, was slain by Odysseus with the aid of Eumaeus, Philoetius, and Telemachus.
 Euryalus, also one of the Suitors of Penelope from Zacynthus with other 43  wooers. He suffered the same fate as his above namesake.
In the Aeneid by Virgil, Nisus and Euryalus are ideal friends and lovers, who died during a raid on the Rutulians.
Euryalus, a surname of Apollo.

Other uses
Hyalophora euryalus, the ceanothus silkmoth, a species of moth of the family Saturniidae
Protambulyx euryalus, a species of moth of the family Sphingidae

Notes

References 

 Apollodorus, The Library with an English Translation by Sir James George Frazer, F.B.A., F.R.S. in 2 Volumes, Cambridge, MA, Harvard University Press; London, William Heinemann Ltd. 1921. ISBN 0-674-99135-4. Online version at the Perseus Digital Library. Greek text available from the same website.
 Gaius Julius Hyginus, Fabulae from The Myths of Hyginus translated and edited by Mary Grant. University of Kansas Publications in Humanistic Studies. Online version at the Topos Text Project.
 Homer, The Iliad with an English Translation by A.T. Murray, Ph.D. in two volumes. Cambridge, MA., Harvard University Press; London, William Heinemann, Ltd. 1924. . Online version at the Perseus Digital Library.
 Homer, Homeri Opera in five volumes. Oxford, Oxford University Press. 1920. . Greek text available at the Perseus Digital Library.
 Pausanias, Description of Greece with an English Translation by W.H.S. Jones, Litt.D., and H.A. Ormerod, M.A., in 4 Volumes. Cambridge, MA, Harvard University Press; London, William Heinemann Ltd. 1918. . Online version at the Perseus Digital Library
 Pausanias, Graeciae Descriptio. 3 vols. Leipzig, Teubner. 1903.  Greek text available at the Perseus Digital Library.
 Pliny the Elder, The Natural History. John Bostock, M.D., F.R.S. H.T. Riley, Esq., B.A. London. Taylor and Francis, Red Lion Court, Fleet Street. 1855. Online version at the Perseus Digital Library.
 Pliny the Elder, Naturalis Historia. Karl Friedrich Theodor Mayhoff. Lipsiae. Teubner. 1906. Latin text available at the Perseus Digital Library.
 Publius Vergilius Maro, Aeneid. Theodore C. Williams. trans. Boston. Houghton Mifflin Co. 1910. Online version at the Perseus Digital Library.
 Publius Vergilius Maro, Bucolics, Aeneid, and Georgics. J. B. Greenough. Boston. Ginn & Co. 1900. Latin text available at the Perseus Digital Library.
 Tzetzes, John, Allegories of the Iliad translated by Goldwyn, Adam J. and Kokkini, Dimitra. Dumbarton Oaks Medieval Library, Harvard University Press, 2015. 

Argonauts
Epigoni
Achaean Leaders
Suitors of Penelope
Children of Odysseus
Characters in the Aeneid
Characters in the Odyssey
Aetolian characters in Greek mythology
Argive characters in Greek mythology
Phaeacians in Greek mythology